Fort Nelson/Mobil Sierra Airport  was located  northeast of Fort Nelson, British Columbia, Canada.

See also
Fort Nelson Airport
Fort Nelson (Parker Lake) Water Aerodrome
Fort Nelson/Gordon Field Airport

References

Defunct airports in British Columbia
ExxonMobil buildings and structures